Punta Carretas is a barrio (neighbourhood or district) of Montevideo, Uruguay.

Location
Punta Carretas shares borders with Parque Rodó and Pocitos to the north, while from east south and west, it is delimited by the coastline, including the Rambla (seaside avenue): Rambla Presidente Wilson to the west, Rambla Mahatma Gandhi to the east.

Landmarks
In its west side, this barrio is home to the park called Parque Rodó with all its southern extensions (Canteras del Parque Rodó, Teatro de Verano, Lago del Parque Rodó), to the ground of the Faculty of Engineering, as well as to the Golf Club de Montevideo and the Holocaust Memorial, while in its east side, it is home to the Punta Carretas Shopping (mall), the Sheraton Hotel, the Parque Villa Biarritz and the Juan Zorrilla de San Martin Museum. Its southern part ends in the cape of Punta Carretas, also known as Punta Brava, which gives the name to the barrio. At the tip of the cape is Punta Carretas Lighthouse, built in 1876.

Places of worship
 Parish Church of Our Lady of the Sacred Heart, popularly known as "Iglesia de Punta Carretas" (Roman Catholic)

See also 
Barrios of Montevideo

External links 

 Intendencia de Montevideo / Useful data / Punta Carretas
 Intendencia de Montevideo / Parques y Plazas / Parque Rodó (about the park, not the barrio)
 Revista Raices / Historia del barrio Punta Carretas y Parque Rodó

 
Headlands of Uruguay
Barrios of Montevideo